The 2013–14 Russian Basketball Cup was the 13th season of the Russian Basketball Cup. From the Eightfinals till the Final, all teams played two legs to decide which team advanced. UNICS Kazan and Lokomotiv Kuban qualified for the Final, Krasny Oktyabr and Khimki were semifinalists. Unics won the cup on May 14, 2014. Drew Goudelock exploded for 36 points in the final game.

Bracket
All rounds were played over two legs.

Semifinals

Game 1

Game 2

Finals

Awards

Most Valuable Player
 Drew Goudelock (UNICS Kazan)
All-Season Team
 Marcus Williams (Lokomotiv Kuban)
 Krunoslav Simon (Lokomotiv Kuban)
 Von Wafer (Krasny Oktyabr)
 Vladimir Veremeenko (UNICS Kazan)
 Krešimir Lončar (Khimki)

2013–14
Cup